HWB may refer to:

 Hwb, a Welsh education website
 HWB color model, a representation of points in an RGB color model
 Hardware write block device, a type of computer hard disk controller
 Hawaii Winter Baseball, a defunct professional baseball league
 Health and wellbeing board, various statutory bodies in England
 Heavy Water Board, of India's Department of Atomic Energy
 Helmert–Wolf blocking, a statistical algorithm
 Hochwohlgeboren, an honorific in Europe
 Homeopaths Without Borders, a pseudoscientific nonprofit organization
 Hybrid wing body, a type of fixed-wing aircraft